Oyam is a town in western Gabon. As of October 2020, it has a population of around 30,100.

Transport 
It is served by a station on the Trans-Gabon Railway.

See also 
 Transport in Gabon

References 

Populated places in Moyen-Ogooué Province